My Seawoman is a 1990 Soviet comedy film written and directed by Anatoly Eiramdzhan.

Plot 
The film takes place in a resort town in the Crimea (the shooting took place in Koktebel), where the competition Where are you, talents? takes place every day. Suddenly a man comes from Murmansk, sings the song My Seawoman and demands the main prize.

Cast 
According to kino-teatr.ru
 Lyudmila Gurchenko as Lyudmila Pashkova, master of ceremonies
 Tatyana Vasileva as Tatyana Ptashuk, accompanist
 Mikhail Derzhavin as Mikhail Gudkov
 Lyubov Polishchuk as lambada dancer
 Roman Ryazantsev as Kolya, son of Pashkova
 Anastasiya Nemolyaeva as Masha, girlfriend of Kolya
 Georgiy Martirosyan as Suzdalev, actor and friend of Pashkova
 Roksana Babayan as musical instrument rental employee
 Sergey Tsigal as man in the audience
 Yekaterina Zinchenko as Gudkov's colleague in Moscow
 Anatoly Eiramdzhan as Gudkov's colleague in Moscow (uncredited)

References

External links 
 

1990 films
1990s Russian-language films
Soviet comedy films
Films set in Crimea
1990 comedy films